Salon des Refusés is a popular Australian art exhibition which shows some of the rejected submissions to the Archibald Prize, Australia's most prestigious art prize for portraiture, and also the Wynne Prize entries for landscape & figure sculpture. The Salon des Refusés exhibition was initiated in 1992 by the S.H. Ervin Gallery in Sydney, in response to the large number of works entered into the Archibald Prize not selected for hanging in the official exhibition. Its name comes from a similar event that started in Paris in 1863, also called Salon des Refusés (French for "Salon of the Rejected"). S.H. Ervin Gallery is still the venue for Salon des Refusés.

Each year, after the judging for the Archibald Prize is done, selectors from the S.H. Ervin Gallery choose a selection of works that are representative of the works submitted for the Archibald Prize, but not accepted for consideration. The selected works are exhibited in the Salon des Refusés. The Salon des Refusés often is the first opportunity that many artists have of broader public attention. The criteria for selection are quality, diversity, experimentation and wit.

The Holding Redlich People’s Choice Award commenced in 1999. The award is sponsored by the Sydney based law firm Holding Redlich. The winner is selected by votes from visitors to the Salon des Refusés. In 2016 the prize was AU$2,000.

Past winners of the Salon des Refusés People's Choice Award 
1999 Zhou Xiaoping Jimmy Pike & Zhou Xiaoping 
2000 Evert Ploeg Richard Roxburgh
2001 Guy Maestri Silent Assembly
2002 David Naseby Richard Hall 
2003 Jiawei Shen Edmund Capon 
2004 Juan Ford Allan & Goliath (Allan Fels)  
2005 Margaret Woodward The hobby-horse rider (Self portrait)
2006 Gillian Dunlop Portrait of John Gaden
2007 Jiawei Shen Tri-selves (Self portrait)
2008 Peter Smeeth Philip Adams – The Rematch
2009 Zhong Chen Charles Blackman
2010 Ann Cape Kevin in his studio (Portrait of Kevin Connor)
2011 Robert Hannaford Portrait of Trevor Jamieson 
2012 Barbara Tyson Ita  
2013 Christopher McVinish Portrait of Colin Friels 
2014 Nick Stathopoulos Ugly (Portrait of author Robert Hoge) 
2015 Paul Trefry Homeless still human (Sculpture of a homeless man)  
2016 Tianli Zu The senator and Ma (Portrait of Senator Penny Wong)
2017 Luke Cornish Ben (portrait of artist Ben Quilty)
2018 Sally Ryan Portrait of the Artist's Son (Ben Ryan, Artist)

References
Let's Face It: The History of the Archibald Prize,  AGNSW 2009  , pages 98, 105, 110, 157.

External links 
 S.H. Ervin Gallery website
 
  
2004 winner, stateart.com.au
2002 opening, dcita.gov.au

Australian art awards
Awards established in 1992
1992 establishments in Australia
Archibald Prize